Roberto "Bob" De Piero (born 25 December 1954) is an Italian ice hockey player. He competed in the men's tournament at the 1984 Winter Olympics.

References

External links

1954 births
Living people
Asiago Hockey 1935 players
Brunico SG players
EC Red Bull Salzburg players
HC Valpellice players
HC Varese players
Ice hockey players at the 1984 Winter Olympics
Italian ice hockey players
North Dakota Fighting Hawks men's ice hockey players
Olympic ice hockey players of Italy
Sportspeople from Thunder Bay